The Insignia Towers, also known as 2301 6th Avenue and formerly as the Embassy Development Project, are a pair of 41-story residential skyscrapers in the Denny Regrade neighborhood of Seattle, Washington. The buildings are mainly residential condominiums with lower-level shops. The project was originally approved in 2007, but was placed on hold during the late-2000s recession; it was revived in 2012 and began construction that year. The South Tower was completed in 2015, and the North Tower was completed in 2016. The two towers have 707 residential units and 1,000 parking spaces.

History
In 2007 Embassy Development bought the property and gained approval to build two 440 foot condo towers on it. The project was originally expected to be finished in 2011. However, the project was cancelled following the 2008 economic crisis. The property was transferred to Bosa Development, which, aims to construct the southern tower by 2015 and the northern tower by the end of 2016.

References

External links

Residential skyscrapers in Seattle
Twin towers
Residential buildings completed in 2016